A geomancer is a practitioner of geomancy, a method of divination.

Geomancer may also refer to:

 Geomancer (comics), a DC Comics character
 Geomancer (Dungeons & Dragons), a character class in Dungeons & Dragons
 Geomancer (Final Fantasy), a character class in Final Fantasy
 Geomancer (novel), a 2002 book by Ian Irvine
 Geomancers (comics), a group of fictional comic book characters